The Berlin Defence is a chess opening that begins with the moves:

1. e4 e5
2. Nf3 Nc6
3. Bb5 Nf6

The code C65 covers White moves other than 4.0-0, such as 4.d3 (4.Nc3 is considered a variation of the Four Knights Game). The code C66 covers the variation 4.0-0 d6, and the code C67 covers the variation 4.0-0 Nxe4 (usually regarded as the main line of the Berlin Defence).

History 
The opening was first analysed in depth in the 19th century, and received its name from the Berliners that examined its variations. Due to the defensive and drawish nature of the opening, it is sometimes referred to as the Berlin Wall. The opening was rarely used in high-level games and received little attention until the Classical World Chess Championship 2000, in which challenger Vladimir Kramnik used it as a drawing weapon against champion Garry Kasparov. Kramnik used the Berlin in games 1, 3, 9 and 13 in the match (each time as Black), all four of which were drawn. After losing the match, Kasparov cited Kramnik's superior opening preparation as a reason for his loss. In an interview with John Henderson, Kramnik described his use of the Berlin:The Berlin Defence suited my strategy for the match. I had a defensive strategy – Actually, I had in my pocket some other sharper stuff to fall back on – but first I wanted to try the defensive strategy with Black and it worked so well. This was all new to Kasparov – he probably expected me to fight for equality with Black.The 2000 match caused a resurgence of interest in the Berlin Defence at all levels of the game, such as its use by Magnus Carlsen and Viswanathan Anand in games 4, 6, 7 and 8 of the World Chess Championship 2013. It is now regarded as a  opening for Black to use in order to achieve an  endgame.

Basics 
Black's third move attacks the e4 pawn. However, it is not an actual threat, since if Black captures on e4 then White can win back the e5 pawn. Usually in the Berlin Defence, the players exchange queens early, causing the game to quickly enter an endgame. The resulting endgames are generally viewed as equal or very slightly favourable for White. Black has the disadvantage of doubled pawns and a king stuck in the centre, but has compensation in the form of the bishop pair. Strategically, the Berlin Defence is normally used as a drawing weapon by players who want to obtain a draw as Black, and by players who prefer to play defensively and reach endgames.

Statistics 
The chess database chessgames.com contains 9,264 games in which the Berlin Defence was played, making it the second-most popular variation of the Ruy Lopez and constituting about 17% of all Ruy Lopez games. Of the games in which it was played, 33.1% were wins for White, 22.4% wins for Black, and 44.5% drawn. The relatively high drawing rate of the opening compared to other lines has contributed to its reputation as a drawing weapon. For comparison, the overall rates for the Ruy Lopez are 36.7% wins for White, 24.7% wins for Black, and 38.6% drawn.

Main variations 
The most common fourth move for White, which leads into the main lines of the Berlin, is 4. 0–0. The typical continuation is ...Nxe4 5. d4 Nd6 6. Bxc6 dxc6 7. dxe5 Nf5 8. Qxd8+ Kxd8 (sometimes called the l'Hermet variation), which was played in all four Berlin games of the Classical World Chess Championship 2000. Similarly to the Semi-Tarrasch Defense, the queens are exchanged off the board early, leading to a position that is difficult for White to win. Vladimir Kramnik assesses the endgame as better for White, but believes that this advantage is usually insufficient to win and that Black should be able to draw. Black's alternatives are generally regarded as inferior, such as 4...d6 which is considered too passive, and 4...Bc5 which allows White to play 5.Nxe5 (preparing to respond to 5...Nxe5 with 6.d4) or 5.c3.

An increasingly popular option for players who wish to avoid this line is 4.d3, known as the Anti-Berlin. This line avoids exchanging off the queens early in the game and so sidesteps the traditional Berlin endgame. Black typically responds 4...Bc5 or less commonly 4...d6. 4...Ne7 is the Mortimer Trap, which wins a piece if White plays 5.Nxe5, but is regarded as an inferior move because it loses time by moving the same piece twice.

White can also play 4.Nc3, which transposes to the Four Knights Game.

Other than 4.0-0, 4.d3 and 4.Nc3, other fourth moves for White are rarely seen.

Berlin draw 

A line colloquially known as the Berlin draw is often utilized by top-level players in both over-the-board and online play to agree to an early draw: 1.e4 e5 2.Nf3 Nc6 3.Bb5 Nf6 4.0-0 Nxe4 5.d4 Nd6 6.dxe5 Nxb5 7.a4 Nbd4 8.Nxd4 Nxd4 9.Qxd4 d5 10.exd6 e.p. Qxd6 11.Qe4+ Qe6 12.Qd4 Qd6 13.Qe4+ Qe6 14.Qd4 Qd6, with the game ending in a threefold repetition draw claim on move 14, or on move 18 via the automatic draw for fivefold repetition. Among top-rated players on Chess.com (rated 2700 or higher) from 2020, there were 87 games that used the line to come to an early draw.

The line is not a forcing draw if white does not play en passant, although white has little to no advantage and it is generally considered that there are better ways to play for advantage in the Berlin. This line was featured in the game Erigaisi-Gukesh, Wijk aan Zee, 2023, seen here. After en passant, both sides do have nothing better to do than repeat and draw.  

In the classical portion of the grand finals of the FIDE Grand Prix 2022, Hikaru Nakamura and Wesley So used the line to agree to a draw; the game ended in less than 20 minutes, with some bystanders speculating that Nakamura chose to play the quick draw to better prepare for the ongoing Chess.com Rapid Chess Championship.

Ian Nepomniachtchi utilized this line against Nakamura in Round 12 of the Candidates Tournament 2022, forcing a quick draw by repetition. With two rounds remaining in the tournament, the draw extended Nepomniachtchi's lead in the tournament while Nakamura found the result acceptable to keep his second place position. Thus, both players benefited from the draw in light of the incumbent World Champion Magnus Carlsen's suggestion that he would not play another World Championship match, leaving the match to the first and second place finishers of the Candidates. By the end of the game, Nakamura had taken less than a minute off his clock to make his moves while Nepomniachtchi had used seven minutes.

During the World Blitz Chess Championship 2022 a match between Richárd Rapport with white, and Nakamura with black, ended in a Berlin Draw that took just 36 seconds from first move to the threefold repetition.

Example games 

 Kasparov–Kramnik, Classical World Chess Championship 2000, game 1: 1.e4 e5 2.Nf3 Nc6 3.Bb5 Nf6 4.0-0 Nxe4 5.d4 Nd6 6.Bxc6 dxc6 7.dxe5 Nf5 8.Qxd8+ Kxd8 9.Nc3 Bd7 10.b3 h6 11.Bb2 Kc8 12.h3 b6 13.Rad1 Ne7 14.Ne2 Ng6 15.Ne1 h5 16.Nd3 c5 17.c4 a5 18.a4 h4 19.Nc3 Be6 20.Nd5 Kb7 21.Ne3 Rh5 22.Bc3 Re8 23.Rd2 Kc8 24.f4 Ne7 25.Nf2 Nf5 
 Anand–Carlsen, World Chess Championship 2013, game 4: 1. e4 e5 2. Nf3 Nc6 3. Bb5 Nf6 4. 0-0 Nxe4 5. d4 Nd6 6. Bxc6 dxc6 7. dxe5 Nf5 8. Qxd8+ Kxd8 9. h3 Bd7 10. Rd1 Be7 11. Nc3 Kc8 12. Bg5 h6 13. Bxe7 Nxe7 14. Rd2 c5 15. Rad1 Be6 16. Ne1 Ng6 17. Nd3 b6 18. Ne2 Bxa2 19. b3 c4 20. Ndc1 cxb3 21. cxb3 Bb1 22. f4 Kb7 23. Nc3 Bf5 24. g4 Bc8 25. Nd3 h5 26. f5 Ne7 27. Nb5 hxg4 28. hxg4 Rh4 29. Nf2 Nc6 30. Rc2 a5 31. Rc4 g6 32. Rdc1 Bd7 33. e6 fxe6 34. fxe6 Be8 35. Ne4 Rxg4+ 36. Kf2 Rf4+ 37. Ke3 Rf8 38. Nd4 Nxd4 39. Rxc7+ Ka6 40. Kxd4 Rd8+ 41. Kc3 Rf3+ 42. Kb2 Re3 43. Rc8 Rdd3 44. Ra8+ Kb7 45. Rxe8 Rxe4 46. e7 Rg3 47. Rc3 Re2+ 48. Rc2 Ree3 49. Ka2 g5 50. Rd2 Re5 51. Rd7+ Kc6 52. Red8 Rge3 53. Rd6+ Kb7 54. R8d7+ Ka6 55. Rd5 Re2+ 56. Ka3 Re6 57. Rd8 g4 58. Rg5 Rxe7 59. Ra8+ Kb7 60. Rag8 a4 61. Rxg4 axb3 62. R8g7 Ka6 63. Rxe7 Rxe7 64. Kxb3 ½–½
 Radjabov–Carlsen, Morelina-Linares 2008: 1. e4 e5 2. Nf3 Nc6 3. Bb5 Nf6 4. d3 Bc5 5. c3 0-0 6. 0-0 d5 7. Nbd2 dxe4 8. Nxe4 Nxe4 9. dxe4 Qf6 10. Qe2 Bg4 11. h3 Bxf3 12. Qxf3 Qxf3 13. gxf3 Ne7 14. f4 c6 15. Bc4 exf4 16. Bxf4 Ng6 17. Bg3 Rfe8 18. Rfe1 Rad8 19. Rad1 Rxd1 20. Rxd1 Rxe4 21. Rd8+ Nf8 22. Bd3 Re1+ 23. Kg2 a5 24. Ra8 Rd1 25. Bc4 Bb6 26. Rb8 Rd7 27. Ba6 bxa6 28. Rxb6 f6 29. Rxa6 Rd2 30. b4 axb4 31. cxb4 Rb2 32. Bd6 Ne6 33. a4 Rc2 34. a5 Kf7 35. Bc5 Nf4+ 36. Kf3 Nd5 37. Rb6 Rc4 38. Rb7+ Kg6 39. a6 Rc3+ 40. Kg2 Nf4+ 41. Kg1 Nxh3+ 42. Kh2 Nf4 43. Be3 
 Poyatos–Roktim, Andorra Open 2006:  1. e4 e5 2. Nf3 Nc6 3. Bb5 Nf6 4. d3 Bc5 5. c3 0-0 6. Bg5 h6 7. Bh4 Be7 8. Nbd2 d6 9. h3 Bd7 10. g4 Nxe4 11. Nxe4 Bxh4 12. g5 Bxg5 13. Nfxg5 hxg5 14. Qh5 Bf5 15. Nxg5 Bg6 16. Qh4 Qf6 17. Rg1 Ne7 18. 0-0-0 c6 19. Ba4 Qf4+ 20. Qxf4 exf4 21. Rde1 Rfe8 22. d4 Nd5 23. Bb3 Nc7 24. h4 d5 25. Nh3 Rxe1+ 26. Rxe1 Ne6 27. Bd1 Kf8 28. Bg4 Re8 29. Kd2 Re7 30. Bxe6 Rxe6 31. Rxe6 fxe6 32. Nxf4 Bf5 33. Ne2 Kf7 34. Ke3 Kf6 35. Kf4 Bg6 36. Ng3 Bd3 37. f3 Bb1 38. a3 Bg6 39. Nf1 Bh5 40. b4 Be8 41. Ne3 Bh5 42. Ng4+ Ke7 43. Kg5 Be8 44. Ne5 Kd6 45. Nd3 Ke7 46. Nf4 Kd6 47. Ng6 Bf7 48. f4 Be8 49. Ne5 Ke7 50. h5 Kd6 51. Ng6 Bf7 52. Nh4 Ke7 53. f5 exf5 54. Nxf5+ Kf8 55. Nh4 Ke7 56. Nf3 Ke6 57. Ne5 Be8 58. Nd3 Bf7 59. Nf4+ Kd6 60. h6 gxh6+ 61. Kxh6 Ke7 62. Kg5 Be8 63. Kf5 Bf7 64. Ke5 Be8 65. Nd3 Bg6 66. Nc5 b5 67. Na6 Kd7 68. Kf6 Be8 69. Nc5+ Kd6 70. Nd3 Bh5 71. Ne5 Be8 72. Nf3 Bh5 73. Nh4 Bg4 74. Kf7 Bh5+ 75. Kf8 Ke6 76. Ng2 Kd7 77. Nf4 Bg4 78. Nd3 Bh5 79. Nc5+ Kd6 80. a4 bxa4 81. Nxa4 Kd7 82. Nc5+ Kd6 83. Nd3 Kd7 84. Ne5+ Kd6 85. Kg7 Be2 86. Kf6 Bh5 87. Nd3 Be2 88. Nf4 Bg4 89. Ng6 Bh5 90. Ne5 Be8 91. Ng4 Bd7 92. Ne3 Bh3 93. Kf7 Kd7 94. Nd1 Bg4 95. Nb2 Bh5+ 96. Kf6 Kd6 97. Nd3 Be2 98. Nf4 Bg4 99. Kg7 Be6 100. Kf8 Kd7 101. Kg7 Bg4 102. Nd3 Bh5 103. Kf8 Kd8 104. Nf4 Bg4 105. Ng6 Bh5 106. Ne5 Be8 107. Ng4 Bh5 108. Nf6 Bg6 109. Kg7 Bd3 110. Kf8 Bf5 111. Ng8 Kd7 112. Kg7 Be6 113. Kf6 Bg4 114. Ne7 Kd6 115. Ng6 Bd7 116. Nh4 Bg4 117. Kf7 Kc7 118. Ke7 Bd1 119. Nf5 Bg4 120. Nh6 Bh5 121. Ng8 Bg6 122. Nf6 Be4 123. Ne8+ Kb6 124. Kd6 Bd3 125. Nf6 Kb7 126. Kc5 a6 127. Kd6 Bc4 128. Nd7 Bb5 129. Nc5+ Kc8 130. Ke6 Kc7 131. Ke7 Kc8 132. Kd6 Kb8 133. Kd7 Ka7 134. Kc7 Ka8 135. Nb3 Ka7 136. Na5 Ka8 137. Nxc6 1–0

References 

Chess openings